Hans Diedrich Henatsch served as the Head of the Department of Neurophysiology of the Medical School of the Georg-August-Universität Göttingen from the early sixties to the mid nineties.

He was a long-standing friend and colleague of Ragnar Granit and John Eccles. He became known in the sixties for recordings from spinal cord cells in anesthetized cats and his research in spinal cord physiology and spasticity.

On June 5 (Henatsch's birthday) 1997, after his death, Prof. Diethelm Richter (Henatsch's successor) organized a little memorial in the institute, on which occasion Eike Schomburg gave the laudatio.

Influential publications
 Granit, R. and Henatsch, H. D. (1956). "Gamma control of dynamic properties of muscle spindles", J. Neurophysiol. 19, 356-366.
 Granit, R., Henatsch, H.-D. and Steg, G. (1956), Tonic and Phasic Ventral Horn Cells Differentiated by Post-Tetanic Potentiation in Cat Extensors. Acta Physiologica Scandinavica, 37: 114–126. 
 Henatsch, H. -D.  and Ingvar, D. H. (1956). Chlorpromazin und Spastizität. European Archives of Psychiatry and clinical neuroscience, 195:77-93,

References

External links
Zentrum Physiologie und Pathophysiologie, Abteilung Neuro- und Sinnesphysiologie

German neuroscientists
Systems scientists
Cyberneticists
1997 deaths
Year of birth missing